Joseph John Skaff  (born 13 June 1930) is a retired major general in the United States Army who served as Commander of Fort Devens. He is a 1955 graduate of the United States Military Academy.

References

1930 births
Living people
United States Army generals
Military personnel from Charleston, West Virginia